Nguyễn Tiến Nhật (born April 5, 1990 in Ho Chi Minh City) is a Vietnamese épée fencer.

He was flagbearer for Vietnam at the Olympics opening ceremony of the 2012 Summer Olympics on July 27, 2012.

He competed in the 2012 Summer Olympics in the Men's épée event.

References

External links
 
Personal details

Vietnamese male fencers
1990 births
Living people
Sportspeople from Ho Chi Minh City
Fencers at the 2012 Summer Olympics
Olympic fencers of Vietnam
Fencers at the 2010 Asian Games
Fencers at the 2014 Asian Games
Fencers at the 2018 Asian Games
Asian Games bronze medalists for Vietnam
Asian Games medalists in fencing
Medalists at the 2014 Asian Games
Southeast Asian Games medalists in fencing
Southeast Asian Games gold medalists for Vietnam
Southeast Asian Games silver medalists for Vietnam
Southeast Asian Games bronze medalists for Vietnam
Competitors at the 2011 Southeast Asian Games
Competitors at the 2015 Southeast Asian Games
Competitors at the 2017 Southeast Asian Games
Competitors at the 2019 Southeast Asian Games
Competitors at the 2021 Southeast Asian Games
20th-century Vietnamese people
21st-century Vietnamese people